The following lists events that happened during 2014 in Switzerland.

Incumbents
Federal Council:
Doris Leuthard 
Eveline Widmer-Schlumpf
Ueli Maurer
Didier Burkhalter (President)
Johann Schneider-Ammann 
Simonetta Sommaruga 
Alain Berset

Events

January
 January 20 - World leaders are meeting in Davos for the World Economic Forum.

February
 February 9 - 50.3% of voters vote in favor of the federal popular initiative "against mass immigration", to re-introduce quotas of immigrants for foreigners.

April
 April 6 - Holcim agrees to a merger that would create a firm with a market value of $55 billion with LaFarge of France.

May
 May 18 - Voters in Switzerland resoundingly reject a proposed law change that would have given that country the world's highest minimum wage.

August
 August 13 - Three train cars derail and 11 people are injured after a landslide hits a mountain train in the Swiss Alps.

November
 November 13 - A spokeswoman for the public prosecutor in Switzerland confirms existence of open criminal investigations regarding several people who may have taken part in manipulation of the currency exchange markets; such investigations are also underway in the United States and Britain.
 November 16 - At least four people are killed in mudslides in southern Switzerland and northern Italy after days of heavy rain.
 November 30 - 2014 Swiss referendums
 Voters in Switzerland (74%) reject the proposal to reduce immigration from about 80,000 to 16,000 people a year.
 By a similar margin Swiss voters rejected a monetary-policy initiative that would have required the central bank to buy gold.

References

 
Years of the 21st century in Switzerland
2010s in Switzerland